Keighley  is a constituency in West Yorkshire created in 1885 represented in the House of Commons of the UK Parliament since 2019 by Robbie Moore of the Conservative Party.

Since 1959, the seat has been a bellwether (its winner affiliated to the winning party nationally), with two exceptions: in 1979 and 2017, the seat leant to the left, bucking the national result.

Keighley is one of 9 seats won (held or gained) by a Conservative candidate in 2019 from a total of 22 covering its county. Moore's 2019 win was one of 47 net gains by the Conservative Party.

The seat has been considered – relative to others – a marginal seat, as well as a swing seat, since 2005, as its winner's majority has not exceeded 6.2% of the vote since the 10.5% majority won in 2005, and the seat has changed hands three times since that year.

Boundaries

1885–1918: The parishes in the Wapentake of Staincliffe and Ewecross of Cowling, Glusburn, Keighley, Steeton with Eastburn, and Sutton, and the parishes of Haworth, Thornton, and Wilsden.

1918–1950: The Municipal Borough of Keighley, the Urban Districts of Denholme, Haworth, Oakworth, Oxenhope, and Silsden, and the Rural District of Keighley.

1950–1983: The Municipal Borough of Keighley, the Urban Districts of Denholme and Silsden, and in the Rural District of Skipton the parishes of Steeton with Eastburn, and Sutton.

1983–2010: The City of Bradford wards of Craven, Ilkley, Keighley North, Keighley South, Keighley West, and Worth Valley.

2010–present: The City of Bradford wards of Craven, Ilkley, Keighley Central, Keighley East, Keighley West, and Worth Valley. The constituency boundaries remained unchanged.

Unlike many constituencies, Keighley was unaffected by the boundary changes for the 2010 general election; indeed its boundaries have remained unchanged since the 1983 redistribution.

Constituency profile
This constituency covers the town and outskirts of Keighley in West Yorkshire. It  comprises the mostly Labour voting area of Keighley itself, the Conservative voting spa town of Ilkley, and the rural areas of Craven and Worth Valley which are also mostly  Conservative voting. The seat has a large minority with Asian heritage, especially from Pakistan and Bangladesh. The seat is also a semi-reliable bellwether of the national result; it has voted for the party to form the government in  every election since the Second World War except the 1951, 1955, 1979 and 2017 elections, in which it elected Labour MPs despite the Conservatives forming the government.  The constituency is often known as Keighley & Ilkley rather than just Keighley.

Members of Parliament
Since the 1950s, Keighley has been a marginal seat between Labour and the Conservatives. The MP from 1997 was Labour's Ann Cryer, widow of Bob Cryer who was MP for the same seat from 1974 to 1983 (and then for Bradford South, 1987–1994). She retired at the 2010 general election.

Elections

Elections in the 2010s

Elections in the 2000s

Elections in the 1990s

Elections in the 1980s

Elections in the 1970s

Elections in the 1960s

Elections in the 1950s

Elections in the 1940s 

General Election 1939–40:

Another general election was required to take place before the end of 1940. The political parties had been making preparations for an election to take place from 1939 and by the end of this year, the following candidates had been selected: 
Labour; Hastings Lees-Smith
Conservative; Gay Burdett

Elections in the 1930s

Elections in the 1920s

Elections in the 1910s 

 Results compared to December 1910 election

Elections in the 1900s

Elections in the 1890s

Elections in the 1880s

See also 
List of parliamentary constituencies in West Yorkshire

Notes

References
Specific

General
Craig, F. W. S. (1983). British parliamentary election results 1918–1949 (3 ed.). Chichester: Parliamentary Research Services. .

Keighley
Parliamentary constituencies in Yorkshire and the Humber
Politics of Bradford
Constituencies of the Parliament of the United Kingdom established in 1885